Associação Escola Graduada de São Paulo, most commonly referred to as Graded School or Graded, is an American school in São Paulo, Brazil. The school opened on October 17, 1920, in a small schoolhouse on Avenida São João, and in 1961 the current campus was built on Avenida Giovanni Gronchi, in a terrain now facing the slum of Paraisópolis, located in Morumbi.

The school offers education from pre-primary to high school, all offering American-style teaching. The Lower School consists of the Montessori Preprimary program (three years old through Kindergarten).  The high school also offers an International Baccalaureate (IB) diploma and a Brazilian diploma, in addition to the mandatory SACS-accredited American diploma. There are two Advanced Placement courses available: AP Calculus AB and BC. The majority of classes are taught in English, but the school does offer classes in Portuguese, French, and Spanish. Graded's high school offers two to three levels of maths sets per year. The school has 90 classrooms, eight computer labs, an auditorium, an infirmary, two soccer fields, two covered play areas, two gyms, and four science labs. The libraries contain over 50,000 volumes. All graduates receive an American high school diploma.

In 2006, the school finished the construction of an arts center. It is a large structure with two floors, but standing as high as a six-floor building. The first floor houses music and theater activities, with an orchestra room, a band room, six practice rooms (two of which contain pianos, and one an electric drum set), a dance studio, a media center for editing film and music, and a black box theater. The second floor is dedicated to the visual arts, and contains several rooms for ceramics, painting, and drawing. The second floor also has a photography room, complete with its own developing facilities.

In 2010, the Graded Campus Project was developed. In February 2014, Phase I of the project was completed, with a full renovation of the Lower School Playgrounds and Gymnasiums. In March 2017, Phase II of the Graded Campus Project was inaugurated. It included a new Main Entrance, Parking Garage, Student Center, Large Field, Small Field, Track, Beach Volleyball Court, Wellness Gymnasium, and Maintenance Building.

Traditionally more than 95% of the school's graduating class enrolls in a 4-year degree education within one year of graduation.

Accreditation 

Accredited by the Southern Association of Colleges and Schools and the Brazilian Ministry of Education. It is also a member of Association of American Schools in South America.
Graded Campus Project.  Graded school is a member of the Association of American Schools of South America (AASSA), the US National Association of Independent Schools (NAIS) and the American Montessori Society.

Board 

The graded board is composed of a self-perpetuating board, and consists of 12 members that are appointed for up to four 2-year terms.

The board was first established in 1931 and continues to set the school’s fiduciary policies, annual budget and fundraising goals based on input from the superintendent and the Leadership Learning Team.  This board is also in charge of hiring and evaluating the school's  superintendent.

The Graded Campus Project 
The school is currently undergoing an ambitious campus project which is scheduled to finish in 2020, to celebrate its 100th anniversary. An underground garage and modern, eco-friendly classrooms are planned.

Graded began this visionary project in 2010 by developing a plan to modernize its facilities in conjunction with H2L2, a company specializing in international school design. This plan was then used by Zanettini, a São Paulo-based architecture firm famous for its green architecture, to develop detailed architectural specifications based on the overall master educational plan. In conjunction with Hochtief, one of the leading construction companies in Brazil, Graded established a strategically phased approach for implementation.

The first phase of this project was accomplished in 2014,  that included a full renovation of the Lower School Playgrounds and Gymnasiums.

On September 1, 2015, Phase II construction was started. It was inaugurated in March 2017, including a new Main Entrance, Parking Garage, Student Center, Large Field, Small Field, Track, Beach Volleyball Court, Wellness Gymnasium, and Maintenance Building.

See also
 Americans in Brazil

References

External links 
Graded--The American School of Sao Paulo

American international schools in Brazil
International Baccalaureate schools in Brazil
Educational institutions established in 1920
International schools in São Paulo
Private schools in Brazil
Association of American Schools in South America
1920 establishments in Brazil